Nicholas Laurence "Nick" Levan is a fictional character from the third generation in the British teen drama Skins, played by Sean Teale. Nick was introduced in the fifth series and is a former rugby player who used to play for the school team. He has had relationships with Franky Fitzgerald and Mini McGuinness.

Characterisation

Series 5
At the start of series 5, Sean Teale described his character as "balls deep in life".

Series 6
At the start of series 6, Teale said: "Nick has had a heavy summer, rugby is out of the question as his fitness is in doubt and he starts partying hard; a little too hard, I think.

He's a lot more integrated with the group this series. He's a lot friendlier with them, they've warmed to him and they get to see his good side. His relationship with Mini is obviously one he's lost but I don't necessarily think that's a bad thing for him. He gets entangled in a love relationship - a forbidden love relationship that he really shouldn't be in - but Nick being Nick he finds himself in a situation that he doesn't know how to handle without meaning to hurt anyone."

Character history

Series 5
Nick begins the series in a relationship with Mini, and is frequently annoyed by her refusal to sleep with him. He appears to do Mini's dirty work, having covered a hall of photos of Franky's past for her. Eventually he sleeps with Liv whilst still in a relationship with Mini and seems to show strong feelings for her. We find out that Matty Levan is Nick's brother and they have a domineering father, a self-help coach, who views Nick as his favourite son. Nick eventually quits the rugby team and shuns his arrogant friends in favour of a lifestyle filled with partying. Nick is first seen kissing Mini as Franky charging through in episode one of series 5 he later in the episode comes in late explaining he was in rugby whereas he was really covering the walls outside with photos of Franky's past for Mini.

Series 6
In series 6, Nick shares a kiss with new gay character, Alex Henley. He also falls in love with Franky and has sex with her in episode 6. In the series finale, however, Franky officially ends their relationship and Nick is reunited with his brother.

References

Skins (British TV series) characters
Fictional English people
Television characters introduced in 2011
Male characters in television
Teenage characters in television
British male characters in television